The 1985 BCE Welsh Professional Championship was a professional non-ranking snooker tournament, which took place in May 1985.

Terry Griffiths won the tournament defeating Doug Mountjoy 9–4 in the final.

Main draw

References

Welsh Professional Championship
Welsh Professional Championship
Welsh Professional Championship
Welsh Professional Championship